Charlie Hamilton James (born July 1973) is an English photographer, television cameraman and presenter, specialising in wildlife subjects. He started his career at 16, working on David Attenborough's The Trials of Life. His work has since been commissioned by National Geographic Magazine, the BBC's Springwatch/Autumnwatch shows and The Natural World.

His first film made when he was just 26, was My Halcyon River. Following its success, in 2001 he set up a production company, Halcyon Media, which specialises in wildlife productions. In 2007 he produced An Otter in the Family, a short documentary series about the adoption of an otter cub called Grace and his attempts to raise her as a wild animal to be released into the wild. He also produced the four-part Halcyon River Diaries, the first episode of which was broadcast on 16 May 2010 on BBC One. The series follows the wildlife found near his home. An additional episode was shown at Christmas 2010.

Charlie lives in Wyoming, US having moved from Bath in 2015. He has three sons and all three have appeared in his television programmes.

During the week of 30 May – 3 June 2011, Hamilton James presented a segment, comprising pre-recorded video and live commentary to camera, on the reintroduction of beavers to the United Kingdom, as part of the BBC's Springwatch. In June 2014 the TV series I Bought a Rainforest, about his £6,000 purchase of 100 acres of Peruvian rain forest, was screened by the BBC.

Awards

He was Wildlife Cameraman of the Year's 'Young Wildlife Photographer of the Year 91/92' and was nominated in three categories for Wildlife Cameraman of the Year in 2007. He is also a Royal Television Society medal winner for cinematography.

Bibliography

 (a satirical look at The Matrix film trilogy)

DVDs 
Some of Hamilton James' programmes are available commercially:
 Natural World – On the Trail of Tarka, BBC
 Halcyon River Diaries

References

External links
 Official website

 Charlie Hamilton James at Hilary Knight Management
 Digital Splash Event

Living people
English television presenters
English television producers
English nature writers
Photographers from Somerset
1973 births